Dentex is a genus of fish in the family Sparidae.

Species
There are currently 14 recognized species in this genus:
 Dentex abei Iwatsuki, Akazaki & Taniguchi, 2007 (Yellowfin seabream)
 Dentex angolensis Poll & Maul, 1953 (Angolan dentex)
 Dentex barnardi Cadenat, 1970 (Barnard's dentex)
 Dentex canariensis Steindachner, 1881 (Canary dentex)
 Dentex carpenteri Iwatsuki, S. J. Newman & B. C. Russell, 2015 (Yellow snout seabream) 
 Dentex congoensis Poll, 1954	(Congo dentex)
 Dentex dentex	(Linnaeus, 1758) (Common dentex)
 Dentex fourmanoiri Akazaki & Séret, 1999 (Fourmanoir's seabream)	  
 Dentex gibbosus (Rafinesque, 1810) (Pink dentex)
 Dentex hypselosomus Bleeker, 1854 (Yellowback seabream)
 Dentex macrophthalmus (Bloch, 1791) (Large-eye dentex)
 Dentex maroccanus Valenciennes, 1830 (Morocco dentex)
 Dentex spariformis J. D. Ogilby, 1910 (Saffronfin seabream)
 Dentex tumifrons (Temminck & Schlegel, 1843) (Crimson seabream)

References

Sparidae
Marine fish genera
Taxa named by Georges Cuvier